Horrible Histories Prom (televised as "Horrible Histories' Big Prom Party") was a free family concert showcasing the original songs from the British television series Horrible Histories, along with classical music. It was held on 30 July 2011 at the Royal Albert Hall in London, and was that year's children's entry in the BBC's annual Proms series.

Louise Fryer and Rattus Rattus (the black rat puppet "host" of the TV series) presented the concert for BBC Radio 3. The featured performers were the six-member starring cast of Horrible Histories (Mathew Baynton, Simon Farnaby, Martha Howe-Douglas, Jim Howick, Laurence Rickard and Ben Willbond), supported by the  Aurora Orchestra with Nicholas Collon conducting. The Music Centre Children's Choir and Kids Company Choir served as chorus. Orchestral arrangements were made as needed by Iain Farrington.

The 65-minute televised version initially aired the following September. It featured a version of the concert edited to highlight the songs from the TV series, interspersed with snippets of the classical pieces and specially-shot linking sketches set in and around the concert hall, including ones with Rattus Rattus explaining the a historical link to certain pieces.

Setlist

The concert was presented in two parts divided by an interval. As a general theme, songs from the TV series were paired with a classical piece composed in or otherwise relating to that historical era. Various comic interludes spotlighted notable moments in musical history. Several recurring characters and concepts from the series, including reporter Bob Hale, King Henry VIII and Death from "Stupid Deaths", made appearances.

Part 1
 "Sunrise (Fanfare)" from Also sprach Zarathustra - Richard Strauss
 "Horrible Histories Theme Tune"
  HHTV News: Bob Hale presents the Orchestra Report
 "The 4 Georges: Born 2 Rule" (from Horrible Histories, S01E01)
 Interlude: George II discusses the role of the conductor with Nicholas Collon
 Danse Macabre (excerpt) - Camille Saint-Saëns
 Interlude: A peasant couple offer the latest "scientific" cures for the Black Death
 "The Plague Song" (from S01E10)
 Interlude: Life under the feudal system
 "The Truth About Richard III" (S03E06)
 "The Death of Tybalt" from Romeo and Juliet - Sergei Sergeyevich Prokofiev
 Fantasia on Greensleeves (excerpt) - Ralph Vaughan Williams
 Interlude: Henry VIII discusses his marital history
 "The Wives of Henry VIII: Divorced, Beheaded, Died" (S01E02)
 "March to the Scaffold" from Symphonie fantastique - Hector Berlioz
 "Charles II: King of Bling" (S02E02)
 "La réjouissance" from Music for the Royal Fireworks -George Frederic Handel

Part 2
 Marche pour la cérémonie des Turcs - Jean-Baptiste Lully
 Stupid Deaths: Jean-Baptiste Lully
 Interlude: Wolfgang Amadeus Mozart and Ludwig van Beethoven argue over who most deserves the title of Greatest Composer Who Ever Lived
 Overture from The Marriage of Figaro - Wolfgang Amadeus Mozart
 Interlude: George IV discusses his tumultuous political and marital history
 "George IV: Couldn't Stand My Wife" (S02E05)
 "Wedding March" from A Midsummer Night’s Dream (excerpt) - Felix Mendelssohn
Interlude: Queen Victoria cannot perform; Cleopatra steps in at the last minute
 "Ra Ra Cleopatra" (S03E05)
 "The Ages of Stone" (S03E10)
 "Sacrificial Dance” from The Rite of Spring - Igor Stravinsky
Interlude: A (musical) band of Viking warriors invade the hall and head for the stage
 "Ride of the Valkyries" from Die Walküre - Richard Wagner
 "Literally (The Viking Song)" (S02E01)
 Horrible Histories closing theme

Reception

The concert was given 4/5 stars from John Lewis in The Guardian. Describing it as "pitched somewhere between a pantomime, a Footlights revue and an old-school variety show", he added that "it is not clear how much Richie Webb's songs (with enjoyably daft lyrics by the likes of Terry Deary and Dave Cohen) benefited from lavish orchestral arrangements: with Cleopatra's Lady Gaga-inspired theme, or Charles II's swaggering Eminem pastiche, the strings were unnecessary, even intrusive."

Writing in The Daily Telegraph, Benedict Brogan also gave the show 4/5 stars, saying that "the clever touch was to bracket each sketch and song with a smartly chosen selection of classical greatest hits, which the Aurora Orchestra under Nicholas Collon ripped out with élan." He further praised the show's accessibility, noting that "Children who came to see their television heroes were cunningly exposed to music that might in future sound familiar, not frightening."

References

Proms concerts
Concerts at the Royal Albert Hall
Horrible Histories concerts